"I'll Never Get Out of This World Alive" is a song written by Fred Rose and American country music singer-songwriter Hank Williams, released by Williams in 1952.

Background
The song was the last single to be released during Williams' lifetime.  Co-writer Fred Rose, who died a year after the song's release, played a critical role in the development of Williams' songwriting; as Colin Escott points out, it was up to Rose "to separate the gold from the dross and work with Hank to transform the best ideas into integrated, complete statements, taut with commercial logic.  If Rose contributed substantially, as he did on "A Mansion on the Hill" and later "Kaw-Liga," he took half-credit; if he simply doctored Hank's songs, he didn't take a share.  Rose knew that he would get the publisher's half of the royalty, and there is consensus that he was not a greedy man."

Meant to be a humorous song, as evidenced by its ironic title and chorus, the composition took on additional poignancy following Williams' death early in the first hours of January 1953.  Williams recorded the song at Castle Studio in Nashville on June 13, 1952, with backing provided by Jerry Rivers (fiddle), Don Helms (steel guitar), Chet Atkins (lead guitar), Chuck Wright (bass) and probably Ernie Newton (bass). Atkins recalled later, "We recorded 'I'll Never Get Out of this World Alive' and after each take, he'd sit down in a chair.  I remember thinking, 'Hoss, you're not jivin',' because he was so weak that all he could do was just sing a few lines, and then just fall in the chair."

Chart performance
"I'll Never Get Out of This World Alive" reached No. 1 on the Billboard Country Singles chart posthumously in January 1953.

Hank Williams version

Cover versions
The song has been covered by artists such as
The Delta Rhythm Boys 
Jimmy Dale Gilmore
Asleep at the Wheel
Jerry Lee Lewis
Hank Williams Jr.
Hank Williams III
The Little Willies
Steve Earle released an album titled I'll Never Get Out of This World Alive on April 26, 2011, although only the  iTunes album download includes a cover of the song. Earle often covers the song in live performances.
Entombed A.D.

In other media 
 In 1999, the song was used as the theme for the BBC Radio 4 comedy series Married.  
 In 2008, Williams' version of the song was used as the theme for the animated comedy series The Life & Times of Tim.  
 Steve Earle released his first novel in May 2011, which takes its title from the song and tells the story of a doctor haunted by the ghost of Williams.  
 The song was featured during a cutscene in the 2013 video game The Last of Us, in which Ellie reveals to Joel that she stole a cassette tape of the song and the two listen to it while driving.

References

Bibliography
 

1952 songs
Hank Williams songs
Songs written by Hank Williams
Songs written by Fred Rose (songwriter)